Pre-1927 Route 8 Spur was a route in New Jersey that ran from Dingman's Ferry east to Franklin Furnace, existing from 1926 to 1927. Today, it is part of the following routes:
 County Route 560 (New Jersey)
 U.S. Route 206
 New Jersey Route 15
 New Jersey Route 94
 County Route 631 (Sussex County, New Jersey)

08 Spur (pre-1927)